Each national team submitted a squad of 20 players, two of whom had to be goalkeepers.

Players in boldface have been capped at full international level since the tournament.

Ages are as of the start of the tournament, 16 July 2017.

Group A

Finland
Finland named their squad on 13 July 2018.

Head coach: Juha Malinen

Portugal
Portugal named their squad on 11 July 2018.

Head coach: Hélio Sousa

Norway
Norway named their squad on 4 July 2018.

Head coach: Pål Arne Johansen

Italy
Italy named their squad on 11 July 2018.

Head coach: Paolo Nicolato

Group B

Turkey
Turkey named their squad on 16 June 2018.

Head coach: Vedat İnceefe

Ukraine
Ukraine named their squad on 13 July 2018.

Head coach: Oleksandr Petrakov

France
France named their squad on 12 July 2018.

Head coach: Bernard Diomède

England
England named their squad on 16 July 2018.

Head coach: Paul Simpson

References

2018 UEFA European Under-19 Championship
UEFA European Under-19 Championship squads